Pfitzneriella similis is a moth of the family Hepialidae. It is found in Peru.

References

Moths described in 1954
Hepialidae